The 1908 United States House of Representatives elections in Oklahoma were held on November 3, 1908, to elect the five U.S. representatives from the state of Oklahoma, one from each of the state's five congressional districts. Members were elected to full terms that would begin at the start of the 61st Congress. These elections were held concurrently with the 1908 presidential election.

Despite winning the popular vote, the Democratic Party lost seats to the Republican Party, who gained a majority of seats. The Socialist Party also managed to gain popularity in the newly founded state.

Overview

District 1

District 2

District 3

District 4

District 5

Notes

References 

1908
Oklahoma
United States House of Representatives